Souad Sbai (born 1961) is a Moroccan-born Italian politician and writer.

She was born in Settat, Morocco, on 5 February 1961. She has lived in Italy since about 1979.

She was a member of the Italian Chamber of Deputies from 2008 to 2013, and in 2011 sponsored legislation to ban wearing the burqa in public in Italy. She has been criticised, alongside Daniela Santanchè, for "setting the political agenda according to a demeaning image of Muslim women". In 2009 she received death threats from Muslim radicals.

Her doctoral thesis (Naples, 2005) was "Diritti delle donne e associazionismo femminile nei paesi del Maghreb", ("Women's rights and women's associations in the Maghreb countries").

She is a member of the Italy-USA Foundation.

Selected publications
 (Deception: victims of multiculturalism)
 (The broken dream)
 (Isis: behind the stage of horror)

References

External links
Books by Sbai in WorldCat

1961 births
Living people
Deputies of Legislature XVI of Italy
21st-century Italian women politicians
Italian people of Moroccan descent
Women members of the Chamber of Deputies (Italy)